Tejpura may refer to the following places in India :

 Tejpura State, a former princely state in Mahi Kantha, Gujarat
 a village in Mahesana Taluka, Mehsana District, Gujarat, presumably formerly seat of the above petty state
 a village in Aurangabad district, Bihar